A plate in animal anatomy may refer to several things:

Flat bones (examples: bony plates, dermal plates) of vertebrates 
 an appendage of the Stegosauria group of dinosaurs
 articulated armoured plates covering the head of thorax of Placodermi (literally "plate-skinned"), an extinct class of prehistoric fish (including skull, thoracic and tooth plates)
 bony shields of the Ostracoderms (armored jawless fishes) such as the dermal head armour of members of the class Pteraspidomorphi that include dorsal, ventral, rostral and pineal plates
 plates of a carapace, such as the dermal plates of the shell of a turtle
 dermal plates partly or completely covering the body of the fish in the order Gasterosteiformes that includes the sticklebacks and relatives
 plates of dermal bones of the armadillo
 Zygomatic plate, a bony plate derived from the flattened front part of the zygomatic arch (cheekbone) in rodent anatomy

Other flat structures 
 hairy plate-like keratin scales of the pangolin
 Basal plate (disambiguation), several anatomy-related meanings

Other meanings in human anatomy 
 Alar plate, a neural structure in the embryonic nervous system
 Cribriform plate, of the ethmoid bone (horizontal lamina) received into the ethmoidal notch of the frontal bone and roofs in the nasal cavities
 Epiphyseal plate, a hyaline cartilage plate in the metaphysis at each end of a long bone
 Lateral pterygoid plate of the sphenoid, a broad, thin and everted bone that forms the lateral part of a horseshoe like process that extends from the inferior aspect of the sphenoid bone
 Nail plate, the hard and translucent portion of the nail
 Perpendicular plate of the ethmoid bone (vertical plate), a thin, flattened lamina, polygonal in form, which descends from the under surface of the cribriform plate, and assists in forming the septum of the nose

Related structures 
 Scute, a bony external plate or scale overlaid with horn, as on the shell of a turtle, the skin of crocodilians and the feet of birds
 Sclerite, a plate forming the exoskeleton of invertebrates

See also 
 Plate (disambiguation)

Animal anatomy
Flat bones